Ruchir Joshi is an Indian writer, a filmmaker and a columnist for The Telegraph, India Today as well as other publications. He is best known for his debut novel titled The Last Jet-Engine Laugh (2001). He is also the editor of India's first anthology of contemporary erotica Electric Feather: The Tranquebar Book of Erotic Stories, published by Tranquebar Press/Westland.  He has two sons, aged sixteen and twelve.

Life
Ruchir Joshi is the son of writer and dramatist Shivkumar Joshi. Born in 1960, he was brought up in Kolkata. He was educated at Mayo College, Ajmer. He went to the United States of America in 1979, to study in an undergraduate college in Vermont. He moved to New Delhi in 1997 and stayed there till 2007. Since then he has been shuttling between London and Delhi.

Work
Apart from writing regular columns in newspapers and magazines, Joshi made a film on Bauls in 1992. It is called Egaro Mile (Eleven Miles). Early in his life, when he was just out of school, he decided to take up acting and performed in an English play called You're a Good Man, Charlie Brown directed by Zarin Chaudhuri. He wrote a piece called Tracing Puppa which was published in Granta 109 in a series of recollections regarding fathers.

Bibliography
The Last Jet Engine Laugh (2001)
Electric Feather: The Tranquebar Book of Erotic Stories (2009)Poriborton: An Election Diary'' (2011)

See also
Jaipur Literature Festival

References

External links
 Ruchir Joshi at India Today
 Ruchir Joshi at Outlook magazine

Living people
Writers from Kolkata
Indian columnists
English-language writers from India
Indian male novelists
1960 births
20th-century Indian novelists
Novelists from West Bengal
20th-century Indian male writers